The 1989–90 Sri Lankan cricket season was dominated by Sinhalese Sports Club who won both the country's major trophies.

Honours
 Lakspray Trophy – Sinhalese Sports Club
 Brown's Trophy – Sinhalese Sports Club
 Most runs – WAA Wasantha 519 @ 57.66 (HS 134) 
 Most wickets – KPJ Warnaweera 71 @ 13.47 (BB 7-16)

Test series
Sri Lanka played no home Test matches this season.

External sources
  CricInfo – brief history of Sri Lankan cricket
 CricketArchive – Tournaments in Sri Lanka

Further reading
 Wisden Cricketers' Almanack 1991

Sri Lankan cricket seasons from 1972–73 to 1999–2000